Thomas Geoffrey Stuart Smith (called Geoffrey; surnamed Smith or Stuart-Smith; 28 February 19018 December 1981) was an Anglican bishop in the 20th century.

Smith was educated at Felsted School; Jesus College, Cambridge; and Ridley Hall, Cambridge. He was ordained deacon in 1925, and Priest in 1926. He began his career with a curacy at St Mary Magdalene, Bermondsey after which he was Chaplain of Ridley Hall, Cambridge. He was Vice Principal of Cambridge Nicholson Institute and Mission, Kottayam (Kottayam Diocesan College) from 1930 to 1939; Archdeacon of Mavelikkara from 1939 to 1947; and Bishop of North Kerala from 1947 to 1953. Returning to England he held incumbencies at Burwell, Danbury and Swithland. While at Danbury, he was also an Assistant Bishop of Chelmsford (1961–1966); and at Swithland he served as an Assistant Bishop of Leicester (1966–1973).

References

1901 births
1981 deaths
People educated at Felsted School
Alumni of Jesus College, Cambridge
Alumni of Ridley Hall, Cambridge
20th-century Anglican bishops
Church of South India clergy
Anglican bishops of North Kerala